Geçimli  (also called Malya) is a village in Mersin Province, Turkey

Geography
Geçimli  is in Mut district of Mersin Province. Turkey. The population of the village was 507  as of 2011.

History
There are two archaeologically important places in the vicinity of the village. Alaoda Cave is a Cave Chapel and it is unearthed by Michael Gouche in 1955.

Economy
The main economic activity of the village is agriculture. Olive and apricot are two of the main crops.

References

External links
 For images 

Villages in Mut District